The Ice Age Adventures of Buck Wild is a 2022 computer-animated adventure comedy film directed by John C. Donkin, in his feature directorial debut, with a screenplay by Jim Hecht, Ray DeLaurentis, and William Schifrin. It serves as a spin-off of the Ice Age franchise and is set after the events of Ice Age: Collision Course. The film stars the voices of Simon Pegg (reprising his role as Buck Wild), Vincent Tong, Aaron Harris, Utkarsh Ambudkar, and Justina Machado also starring in the film.

It follows the two opossum brothers Crash and Eddie and their adventure to becoming independent possums alongside the titular character Buck Wild. Originally planned to be a television series, The Ice Age Adventures of Buck Wild was redeveloped into a feature-length film. Produced by 20th Century Animation and released under the Walt Disney Pictures label, it was released on January 28, 2022, as a Disney+ original film.

It received generally negative reviews from critics who felt that it lacked a primary focus on the titular character and criticized its recasting of voice actors, animation quality, the absence of Scrat, and the decision to produce the film without the involvement of Blue Sky Studios. The possibility of a sequel to the film was discussed by executive producer Lori Forte.

Plot
In an attempt to practice one of their extreme stunts, Crash and Eddie accidentally cause an avalanche and destroy the gang's summer habitat. Manny, Sid, Diego, and Ellie get mad at them, declaring they would not survive on their own. Wanting to prove them wrong, Crash and Eddie secretly leave their temporary camp while the others are asleep. Finding them gone the next morning, Ellie insists that they go search for them. Meanwhile, Crash and Eddie stumble upon the entrance to the Lost World, a land full of dinosaurs, and run into their old friend Buck, who saves them from raptors and tells them that a Protoceratops named Orson, who was bullied when he was young for having a massive brain, has escaped from exile and has come to conquer the Lost World. Buck tries to get Crash and Eddie back to their home, but finds out that Orson has covered the entrance with a boulder.

Buck and the possums go to Buck's shelter, where Buck explains how he used to be part of an old team that established a watering hole as a place for animals to peacefully co-exist. He goes on to say that Orson did not accept an offer to join his team because he believed in a world where the strong dominate the weak, with him being the leader. Buck further explains that they defeated Orson and banished him to an island, where he learned that he can control two raptors with fire.

The two raptors find Buck's hideout, but Zee, a zorilla who used to be part of Buck's former team, saves Buck and the possums by using a gas to knock out the raptors. Orson then gets an army of raptors and attacks the watering hole, with Buck and Zee telling the animals to evacuate. Buck and Zee, their relationship strained after their team's breakup, go with the possums to get help. They arrive at the Lost Lagoon and summon their old friend Momma, a Tyrannosaurus. When Orson and his raptors arrive and attack them again, Buck and Zee forgive each other for breaking up the old team and agree to work together. Acting as a diversion, Buck is captured by Orson, allowing the others to escape.

Trying to figure out how Orson controls the raptors, Zee and the possums devise a plan to get Buck back. Ellie, Manny, Sid, and Diego find out that Crash and Eddie entered the Lost World and uncover the entrance. They run into Momma, who gives them a ride to the watering hole, where Orson has taken Buck to feed his raptors, planning to use him as an example for anyone who refuses to follow his rules. Zee and the possums free Buck and fight Orson and his army, with Manny, Sid, Diego, Ellie, and Momma joining in the battle. Buck tries to explain to Orson that everyone needs to live in peace, but Orson arrogantly rebuffs him and continues to fight. After figuring out that Orson controls the raptors with fire, Crash and Eddie create a fire of their own and stop the raptors from fighting and make the two raptors chase Orson instead, saving the Lost World.

Ellie, Manny, Sid, and Diego apologize to Crash and Eddie for doubting them and ask them to come home, but Crash and Eddie express that they want to stay in the Lost World with Buck and Zee. Sad to not be with them anymore yet proud to see that their adventure with Buck made them more mature, Ellie allows Crash and Eddie to stay and says goodbye, but Crash and Eddie still come to visit the gang often.

Cast

 Simon Pegg as Buckminster "Buck" Wild: A one-eyed weasel and dinosaur hunter.
 Utkarsh Ambudkar as Orson: A humanoid supremacist Protoceratops with a bulging brain who wants to take control of the Lost World.
 Justina Machado as Zee: A striped polecat who was a former member of Buck's superhero team.
 Vincent Tong and Aaron Harris as Crash and Eddie, respectively: Twin prankster opossum brothers and Ellie's adoptive brothers.
 Dominique Jennings as Ellie: A woolly mammoth, Manny's wife, and Crash and Eddie's adopted sister.
 Jake Green as Sid: A dim-witted ground sloth who is Manny and Diego's best friend and the founder of the herd. He was originally voiced by John Leguizamo from the previous films.
 Sean Kenin Elias-Reyes as Manny: A woolly mammoth who is Ellie's husband, Sid and Diego's best friend and the leader of the herd.
 Skyler Stone as Diego: A saber-tooth tiger who is Manny and Sid's best friend and a member of the herd.

Additional voices include Theo Borders, Jason Harris, Kristin McGuire, Shakira Ja'nai Paye, Peter Pamela Rose, and Jason Linere White.

Production

Development
In July 2016, Bustle noted that the chance of a sixth entry to the Ice Age franchise was relatively high but would depend on the box office performance of the fifth film.

In August 2018, 20th Century Fox CEO Stacey Snider announced the development of a television series centered around the character of Buck, produced by Blue Sky Studios. In December 2020, the project was confirmed to have been redeveloped as a film titled Ice Age: Adventures of Buck Wild, centering around Buck going on an adventure in the Dinosaur World with Crash and Eddie, during the Disney Investor Day 2020 event. Simon Pegg was reported to be reprising his role as Buck.

Blue Sky was closed on April 10, 2021, and consequently, many of their upcoming projects were canceled. Unlike the previous Ice Age films released by 20th Century Fox and produced by 20th Century Fox Animation and Blue Sky, the film was produced by Walt Disney Pictures. Despite this, production on Ice Age: Adventures of Buck Wild continued. When the teaser poster was unveiled, it was revealed that the title had changed from Ice Age: Adventures of Buck Wild to The Ice Age Adventures of Buck Wild, including the word 'the' at the beginning of the title. On January 14, 2022, director John C. Donkin and executive producer Lori Forte said that Blue Sky was never involved in the film. This would later be confirmed by Ice Age: Scrat Tales producers, Chris Wedge, Michael Knapp, and Anthony Nisl in an April 2022 interview with Paste.

Casting
Simon Pegg reprised his role as Buck from Ice Age: Dawn of the Dinosaurs and Ice Age: Collision Course, having been confirmed to when the film was announced. However, he was the only actor to return from the previous films, as Ray Romano, John Leguizamo, Denis Leary, Queen Latifah, Seann William Scott and Josh Peck were replaced.

Animation
The animation was outsourced to Bardel Entertainment in Vancouver. Bardel had previously collaborated with Disney and 20th Century Animation on Diary of a Wimpy Kid (2021). Around 80 people were involved in the creation of The Ice Age Adventures of Buck Wild. Almost all the production was done remotely which led Donkin to never having a meeting with the entire team. Donkin said, "It was a pretty lean crew. But yet, everybody was able to really concentrate and work hard from their homes." He also said that they finished production on the film in late 2020.

Music
Batu Sener composed the musical score. The soundtrack was released on January 28, 2022, by Hollywood Records and Walt Disney Records.

Sener’s score was nominated for Public Choice Award at the 2022 edition of World Soundtrack Awards.

Release

Marketing
The first look of the film was shown on December 10, 2020, at Disney's Investor Day, depicting Crash and Eddie getting saved by Buck and his pterodactyl Penelope from falling to their deaths.

Streaming
The film was released in the United States and Canada on January 28, 2022, as a Disney+ original film. It was later released on Disney+ in other countries on March 25, 2022. However, the film was released on the service under Walt Disney Pictures instead of 20th Century Studios, after being moved from 20th Century Studios and 20th Century Animation.

Reception

Audience viewership 
According to Whip Media's viewership tracking app TV Time, The Ice Age Adventures of Buck Wild  was the 10th most anticipated movie of January 2022. According to data from Samba TV, 797,000 US households watched The Ice Age Adventures of Buck Wild in its first 2 days of streaming. According to Whip Media's viewership tracking app TV Time, The Ice Age Adventures of Buck Wild  was the 8th most watched film across all platforms in the United States, during the week of January 28, 2022 to January 30, 2022, and the 10th during the week of February 4, 2022 to February 6, 2022.

Critical response 
Metacritic, which uses a weighted average, assigned the film a score of 30 out of 100 based on 5 critics, indicating "generally unfavorable reviews".

Courtney Howard of Variety gave the film a negative review, saying how the story's focus is on the major characters of the previous Ice Age films, rather than solely on the titular Buck. She also points out the problematic disability representation and how the animation is "akin to a late-stage pre-viz pass", ending the review saying that the film "should've remained on ice." Natalia Winkleman of The New York Times said that she was disappointed to see the film replace almost all of its celebrity voices and stated that of all the "sins" in the movie, the omission of Scrat was unforgivable. Laura Millar from The Michigan Daily wrote that she was somewhat disappointed in the cast change and the "elementary plot", but said that she was most upset that the film was not made for the same audience as the past Ice Age films. Johnny Loftus of Decider complimented Simon Pegg's performance, but said the world depicted across the movie appears empty and generic, and found the appearances of several characters uninteresting, writing, "The Ice Age Adventures of Buck Wild feels like a tangent, or perhaps a try-out pilot for a small screen Crash & Eddie ‘toon. What it doesn’t feel like is a feature film."

Jennifer Green of Common Sense Media rated the film 3 out of 5 stars and wrote: "Ice Age Adventures of Buck Wild [...] has frequent animated action involving perilous situations and some mild language. [...]  Characters discover qualities in themselves that allow them to gain confidence and improve their relationships. The film has messages about existing peacefully alongside those who are different from you and being a contributing member of your herd [...] and there's some potty humor involving peeing, farting, and other bodily functions." Giving the film a D+, The A.V. Club's Jesse Hassenger negatively compared it to Disney's other direct-to-video sequels, saying: "The new direct-to-streaming Ice Age sequel is a generic chunk of content." Mark Kennedy of the Associated Press gave the film 2 out of 4 stars, writing: "Visually and storytelling-wise it's not a cut above much of what kids can watch on TV these days. This is a franchise that looks like it's slowly going the way of the dinos, while we drool."

Accolades 
Ice Age Adventures of Buck Wild received a nomination for Outstanding Achievement in Sound Editing - Non-Theatrical Animation at the 2022 Golden Reel Awards.

Future
The film's promotional kit mentions another Ice Age film that is in development, with the script being penned by Ray DeLaurentis. Lori Forte discussed the possibility of a sequel, saying, "I think it's a little premature. We hope that people will respond to this, and that will promote us to be able to do another movie. If the audiences want it, we've got plenty of ideas. There's no end to ideas and adventures and characters, so we're ready if they're ready."

References

External links
 
 
 

2020s adventure comedy films
2020s American animated films
2020s children's animated films
2020s English-language films
2022 adventure films
2022 comedy films
2022 computer-animated films
2022 directorial debut films
2022 films
20th Century Animation films
American adventure comedy films
American computer-animated films
Animated films about animals
Animated films set in prehistory
Canadian adventure comedy films
Canadian computer-animated films
Casting controversies in film
Disney controversies
Disney+ original films
English-language Canadian films
Film spin-offs
Ice Age (franchise) films
Walt Disney Pictures animated films